Andrew Michael Hicks (born 9 April 1988) is a Papua New Guinean former cricketer.

Hicks was born at Port Moresby in April 1988. He played minor counties cricket in England for Hertfordshire from 2008–10, making five appearances in the Minor Counties Championship and three appearances in the MCCA Knockout Trophy. He was selected in Papua New Guinea's squad for the 2013 ICC World Twenty20 Qualifier, making a single appearance in the qualifier against Scotland at Abu Dhabi. He did not bat in the match, but did take the wickets of Calum MacLeod and Robert Taylor, finishing with figures of 2 for 26 from four overs.

References

External links

1988 births
Living people
People from the National Capital District (Papua New Guinea)
Papua New Guinean cricketers
Hertfordshire cricketers